Jakub Vojtuš (born 22 October 1993) is a Slovak footballer who plays as a forward for Liga II club Politehnica Iași.

Club career
Born in Spišská Nová Ves, Vojtuš began playing in the local club Spišská Nová Ves, until he was transferred to Žilina in 2006. He made his senior debut for them on 24 October 2009, in a league match against Senica.

Inter Milan signed Vojtuš in March 2010. He was sent on 1–year loan to NK Zagreb during 2012–13 season. 

In August 2013, he was signed by Olhanense, managed by Abel Xavier, and played for 1 year in Portuguese Primeira Liga.

In January 2015, Spartak Trnava signed Vojtuš as a free agent. He made his league debut for them against Spartak Myjava on 28 February 2015.

In August 2020, CFR Cluj signed Vojtuš from Academica Clinceni.

References

External links
90minut.pl
UEFA profile

1993 births
Living people
Sportspeople from Spišská Nová Ves
Slovak footballers
Slovak expatriate footballers
Slovakia youth international footballers
Slovakia under-21 international footballers
Association football forwards
Slovak Super Liga players
Croatian Football League players
Primeira Liga players
I liga players
II liga players
Liga II players
Liga I players
Nemzeti Bajnokság I players
MŠK Žilina players
FC Spartak Trnava players
Inter Milan players
NK Zagreb players
S.C. Olhanense players
FC Universitatea Cluj players
Miedź Legnica players
GKS Tychy players
LPS HD Clinceni players
CFR Cluj players
Mezőkövesdi SE footballers
FC Rapid București players
Expatriate footballers in Italy
Slovak expatriate sportspeople in Italy
Expatriate footballers in Croatia
Slovak expatriate sportspeople in Croatia
Expatriate footballers in Portugal
Slovak expatriate sportspeople in Portugal
Expatriate footballers in Poland
Slovak expatriate sportspeople in Poland
Expatriate footballers in Romania
Slovak expatriate sportspeople in Romania
Expatriate footballers in Hungary
Slovak expatriate sportspeople in Hungary